Frank Herbert Norcross (May 11, 1869 – November 4, 1952) was a United States district judge of the United States District Court for the District of Nevada.

Education and career

Born in Reno, Nevada, Norcross received an Artium Baccalaureus degree from the University of Nevada, Reno in 1891 and a Bachelor of Laws from Georgetown Law in 1894. He was a district attorney of Washoe County, Nevada from 1895 to 1897. He was a member of the Nevada Assembly from 1897 to 1899. He was in private practice in Reno from 1899 to 1904. Norcross became a justice of the Supreme Court of Nevada in 1904, serving until 1916, including terms as chief justice from 1909 to 1911 and from 1915 to 1916. He returned to private practice in Reno from 1917 to 1928.

Federal judicial service

On April 2, 1928, Norcross was nominated by President Calvin Coolidge to a seat on the United States District Court for the District of Nevada vacated by Judge Edward Silsby Farrington. Norcross was confirmed by the United States Senate on April 17, 1928, and received his commission the same day. He assumed senior status on April 30, 1945 serving in that capacity until his death on November 4, 1952, in San Francisco, California.

References

Sources
 

1869 births
1952 deaths
Members of the Nevada Assembly
Justices of the Nevada Supreme Court
Judges of the United States District Court for the District of Nevada
United States district court judges appointed by Calvin Coolidge
20th-century American judges
Chief Justices of the Nevada Supreme Court